Dominick "Dom" Valentino (December 21, 1928 – April 17, 2012) was an American sportscaster.

Personal life
Born in Brooklyn, New York, Valentino grew up in Hingham, Massachusetts.  He earned a bachelor's degree in broadcast journalism from Boston University, and served in the United States Air Force during the Korean War.

Professional career
Valentino began his broadcasting career in New England, calling Boston College football, basketball, and hockey as well as the Boston Bruins of the National Hockey League and the Boston Patriots of the American Football League. He went on to call games for the Cincinnati Royals, Kansas City-Omaha Kings, and New Orleans Jazz of the National Basketball Association in the 1960s and early '70s.

In 1975, Valentino worked with the New York Yankees radio team, alongside Phil Rizzuto, Frank Messer and Bill White. He also announced for the New York Nets basketball team and New York Islanders hockey team that year. He teamed with Red Rush and Ted Robinson on Oakland Athletics radio broadcasts on KDIA for one season in 1980. He also worked at the minor league baseball level, calling games for the New Orleans Pelicans and Las Vegas Stars.

References

1928 births
2012 deaths
American Basketball Association announcers
American Football League announcers
American horse racing announcers
American radio sports announcers
Boston Bruins announcers
Boston Patriots announcers
Boston College Eagles men's basketball announcers
Boston College Eagles football announcers
Boston University College of Communication alumni
Boxing commentators
College basketball announcers in the United States
College football announcers
College hockey announcers in the United States
Major League Baseball broadcasters
Minor League Baseball broadcasters
National Basketball Association broadcasters
National Football League announcers
National Hockey League broadcasters
New York Islanders announcers
New York Jets announcers
New York Nets announcers
New York Yankees announcers
Oakland Athletics announcers
People from Hingham, Massachusetts
Sportspeople from Brooklyn
United States Air Force personnel of the Korean War